Nitroarginine, or Nω-nitro--arginine, also known as L-NOARG, is a nitro derivative of the amino acid arginine. It is an inhibitor of nitric oxide synthase and hence a vasoconstrictor. As such, it finds widespread use as a biochemical tool in the study of nitric oxide and its biological effects.

Nitroarginine has been used in research studying coronary constriction, and it was found that, in the presence of midazolam vasodilatation was unaffected by nitroarginine. Due to the presence of all three isoforms of nitric oxide synthase in striatal tissue in the forebrain, research has also been conducted on how its inhibition might affect monoamine transport and dopamine half-life in the striatal extracellular space.

References

Amino acids
Nitroguanidines